Young and Rich is the second studio album by The Tubes, released in 1976. It reached #46 on the Billboard 200.

The album is no longer available on CD, although all of its songs can be found on White Punks on Dope.

Track listing
"Tubes World Tour" (Spooner, Steen, Waybill) – 4:43
"Brighter Day" (Steen) – 3:39
"Pimp" (Spooner) – 4:27
"Stand Up and Shout" (Ray Trainer, Mike Condello) – 2:37
"Don't Touch Me There" (Ron Nagle, Jane Dornacker) – 3:30
"Slipped My Disco" (Spooner, Steen) – 4:27
"Proud to Be an American" (Spooner) – 2:58
"Poland Whole/Madam I'm Adam" (Steen, Spooner, The Tubes) – 6:30
"Young and Rich" (Spooner) – 5:07

Personnel
Fee Waybill - vocals
Bill "Sputnik" Spooner - guitar, vocals
Roger Steen - guitar, harp, vocals
Rick "Gator" Anderson - bass, vocals
Vince Welnick - keyboards, synthesizer
Michael Cotten - synthesizer
"Preposterous" Prairie Prince - percussion
Re Styles (Shirley MacLeod) - "funky-pretty" vocals
with:
David Paich, Jack Nitzsche - arrangements
Chuck Domanico - bass
Don Randi - piano
Alan Estes, Julius Wechter - percussion
Jay Migliori, Steve Douglas - saxophone
Bobby Shew - trumpet
George Bohanon - trombone
Deniece Williams, Julia Tillman Waters, Maxine Williard Waters, The Ron Hicklin Singers - backing vocals
Allan Harshman, Assa Drori, Harry Bluestone, Herschel Wise, James Getzoff, Jesse Ehrlich, Leonard Malarsky, Lou Klass, Marshall Sosson, Marvin Limonick, Murray Adler, Nathan Ross, Ray Kelley, Samuel Boghossian, Virginia Majewski, William Kurasch - strings
Armand Kaproff, David Speltz - cello
Technical
Ed Thacker - engineer
Michael Cotten, Prairie Prince - album design
Harry Mittman, Norman Seeff - photography

Covers
Lizzy Borden covered "Don't Touch Me There" on their Terror Rising EP.

Charts

References

1976 albums
The Tubes albums
Albums arranged by Jack Nitzsche
Albums produced by Ken Scott
A&M Records albums
Albums recorded at A&M Studios